Summon (originally InstantCab) was a vehicle for hire company operating in portions of Silicon Valley. The company was shut down in November 2014.

Customers were able to pay with Google Wallet.

History
The idea for Summon came after Aarjav Trivedi, its CEO and Founder, waited for over an hour for a bus and then a cab to take him to the airport. He missed an international flight because both were late. Trivedi created InstantCab (later rebranded as Summon) to give people a simple, fast, reliable, and inexpensive form of transportation. Previously, Trivedi founded RideCell which focused on fleet automation to making on-demand transportation fleets easier to manage and access.

Summon was selected to participate in the Winter 2012 Y Combinator meet. Summon received  funding in 2012 from venture capital and angel investors in Silicon Valley including Khosla Ventures, Redpoint Ventures, General Catalyst, Andreessen Horowitz, Facebook Ex-COO Owen Van Natta and Delicious founder Joshua Schachter.

In February 2014, after rebranding from InstantCab to Summon, the company raised another round of funding from existing investors and new investors such as BMW Ventures.

The company also offered drivers extra pay to transport disabled passengers.

Drivers
Taxi drivers were able to sign up to drive for Summon. Taxi drivers were able to get a credit card swiper from Summon for use with street hails or non-Summon customers.

Surge pricing
Summon opposed a dynamic pricing model. Instead of surge pricing, Summon used flat fares on busy times and event days. In addition, it offers a FareBack program, which gives customers a portion of their ride cost back as credits to use on future Summon rides.

Regulatory issues
On March 8, 2013, Summon received a cease and desist letter from San Francisco International Airport, claiming that its community drivers were trespassing by unlawfully conducting business operations on airport property without a permit. Summon responded that its personal drivers were complying with the law because they were not picking up customers at the airport or engaging in commercial activities on airport property. Other vehicle for hire companies operating in San Francisco also received similar cease and desist letters from San Francisco International Airport.

In September 2013, the California Public Utilities Commission legalized vehicle for hire companies. Summon was the first ridesharing company to receive its operating permit from the California Public Utilities Commission, which it received on February 24, 2014.

References

2012 establishments in California
Defunct transportation companies of the United States
Transport companies disestablished in 2014
Defunct companies based in California
Transportation companies based in California